Larry Dwayne Lee (born September 10, 1959) is a former American football center who played eight seasons in the National Football League (NFL).

Biography
Larry was born in Dayton, Ohio, where he attended Nettie Lee Roth High School. After playing football at UCLA, Larry was selected by the Detroit Lions in the fifth round of the 1981 NFL draft. He was an offensive lineman for the Lions, the Miami Dolphins and the Denver Broncos through 1988.

After he retired from the NFL, he later became the vice president of football operations for the Detroit Lions. Interested in funk music from an early age, Lee formed a band, Back in the Day, after his playing career was over.

References

External links
NFL.com player page

1959 births
Living people
Players of American football from Dayton, Ohio
American football centers
UCLA Bruins football players
Detroit Lions players
Miami Dolphins players
Denver Broncos players
Detroit Lions executives